Skeid is a Norwegian football club from Oslo that currently plays in 1. divisjon (OBOS-ligaen), the second tier of the Norwegian football league system. Its current home field is Nordre Åsen, after the club stopped playing at Bislett after the 2012 season. In past decades it has gained a reputation as a talent factory for the larger clubs in Norwegian football, and it has produced several players for the national team such as Daniel Braaten, Daniel Fredheim Holm, Omar Elabdellaoui and Mohammed  Abdellaoue. Other notable players include Paul Miller. Skeid played in 1. divisjon in 2009 after a short stint in the 2. divisjon.  They finished champions of the Second Group of 2. divisjon in 2008. However, Skeid relegated again to 2. divisjon at end of 2009 season in 16th and last position despite a good start. In 2021, Skeid won 2. divisjon group 1 and was promoted to the 1. divisjon.

In 2021, it was announced that Skeid will inherit “several millions” from the controversial Leif Hagen, also known as "Porno-Hagen". Hagen, who was a fan of Skeid og born and raised at Sagene in Oslo, died before Christmas in 2020, leaving a large number of assets of great value to be inherited by Skeid. In the media, there was speculation in values in the order of NOK 30 million (NOK).

Skeid decided that the money from Hagen will not be used short term, but function as a long-term fund and that only the return of the money will be used to further develop the club and its facilities.

They played in the Norwegian top flight between 1938-1970 (Norwegian League did not play between 1940–1947 due to World War II), 1972-1975 (4 seasons), 1978-1980 (3 seasons), 1996-1997 (2 seasons). Their recent season in the top division was in the 1999 Tippeligaen.

Honours
 Norwegian top flight:
 Champions (1): 1966
 Runners-up (5): 1938–39, 1952–53, 1953–54, 1957–58, 1967
 Third (1): 1963
 Norwegian Cup:
 Winners (8): 1947, 1954, 1955, 1956, 1958, 1963, 1965, 1974
 Runners-up (3): 1939, 1940, 1949

Other honours
Oslo Championships
Winners (2): 1940, 1945
Norwegian junior championships
Winners (4): 1962, 1969, 1998, 1999

1929: Won the regional championships after beating Vålerenga 2-1. The red and blue colors are used for the first time.

2020 season 
On January 6, Skeid signed Gard Holme as the new head coach following the relegation from OBOS-ligaen in 2019. Skeid also lost 8 players from the most used starting lineup in 2019 (some signed by other clubs while others hanged up their boots), and due to a strict economy Skeid signed new players from 2. and 3. divisjon. 

The season was put on hold at the start of the year due to the COVID-19 pandemic, and did not start until July. When it first started it was with a reduced schedule, with the 14 teams in the division facing each other once, with the top 7 teams going into a Promotion Playoff, while the bottom 7 teams would be going into a Relegation Playoff.

During the season Skeid played home games at 3 different venues due to problematic circumstances regarding the artificial turf at Nordre Åsen. Therefore, Skeid played some home games at Valhall Arena and LSK-Hallen.

Skeid ended the regular season in 3rd place in the table and therefore qualified for the Promotion Playoff. Skeid ended the playoffs in 2nd place and qualified for a double header with Asker. After 1-1 in both games, the last game went to a penalty shootout, and Asker were victorious with the score 4-2, and ended Skeid's season.

Many supporters saw the season in total as a success, due to the loss of key players before the season started, the signing of a new head coach and the trouble with the home ground.

Recent history 
{|class="wikitable"
|-bgcolor="#efefef"
! Season
! 
! Pos.
! Pl.
! W
! D
! L
! GS
! GA
! P
!Cup
!Notes
|-
|2006
|2. divisjon
|align=right bgcolor=#DDFFDD| 1
|align=right|26||align=right|20||align=right|3||align=right|3
|align=right|67||align=right|23||align=right|63
||Third round
|Promoted to the 1. divisjon
|-
|2007
|1. divisjon
|align=right bgcolor="#FFCCCC"| 15
|align=right|30||align=right|4||align=right|8||align=right|18
|align=right|32||align=right|60||align=right|20
||Third round
|Relegated to the 2. divisjon
|-
|2008
|2. divisjon
|align=right bgcolor=#DDFFDD| 1
|align=right|26||align=right|22||align=right|3||align=right|1
|align=right|88||align=right|28||align=right|69
||Second round
|Promoted to the 1. divisjon
|-
|2009
|1. divisjon
|align=right bgcolor="#FFCCCC"| 16
|align=right|30||align=right|4||align=right|6||align=right|20
|align=right|26||align=right|66||align=right|18
||First round
|Relegated to the 2. divisjon
|-
|2010
|2. divisjon
|align=right |3
|align=right|26||align=right|15||align=right|5||align=right|6
|align=right|49||align=right|28||align=right|50
||Second round
|
|-
|2011
|2. divisjon
|align=right |2
|align=right|26||align=right|16||align=right|4||align=right|6
|align=right|75||align=right|38||align=right|52
||Second round
|
|-
|2012 
|2. divisjon
|align=right bgcolor="#FFCCCC"| 12
|align=right|26||align=right|7||align=right|5||align=right|14
|align=right|42||align=right|55||align=right|26
||Second round
|Relegated to the 3. divisjon
|-
|2013
|3. divisjon
|align=right bgcolor=#DDFFDD| 1
|align=right|26||align=right|20||align=right|3||align=right|3
|align=right|91||align=right|17||align=right|63
||First qualifying round
|Promoted to the 2. divisjon
|-
|2014 
|2. divisjon
|align=right |7
|align=right|26||align=right|13||align=right|3||align=right|10
|align=right|54||align=right|41||align=right|42
||First round
|
|-
|2015 
|2. divisjon
|align=right |9
|align=right|26||align=right|8||align=right|6||align=right|12
|align=right|45||align=right|54||align=right|30
||Second round
|
|-
|2016  
|2. divisjon
|align=right |3
|align=right|26||align=right|15||align=right|7||align=right|4
|align=right|57||align=right|29||align=right|52
||First round
|
|-
|2017 
|2. divisjon
|align=right |5
|align=right|26||align=right|13||align=right|5||align=right|8
|align=right|42||align=right|27||align=right|44
||Second round
|
|-
|2018 
|2. divisjon
|align=right bgcolor=#DDFFDD| 1
|align=right|26||align=right|17||align=right|5||align=right|4
|align=right|59||align=right|25||align=right|56
||Third round
|Promoted to the 1. divisjon
|-
|2019 
|1. divisjon
|align=right bgcolor="#FFCCCC"| 15
|align=right|30||align=right|4||align=right|10||align=right|16
|align=right|38||align=right|54||align=right|22
||Third round
|Relegated to the 2. divisjon
|-
|2020
|2. divisjon
|align=right |2
|align=right|19||align=right|12||align=right|2||align=right|5
|align=right|36||align=right|21||align=right|38
|Cancelled
|Lost promotion play-off
|-
|2021 
|2. divisjon
|align=right bgcolor=#DDFFDD| 1
|align=right|26||align=right|17||align=right|5||align=right|4
|align=right|63||align=right|22||align=right|56
|Second round
|Promoted to the 1. divisjon
|-
|2022
|1. divisjon
|align=right |14
|align=right|30||align=right|8||align=right|4||align=right|18
|align=right|39||align=right|54||align=right|28
|Third round
|
|}
Source:

European record

Current squad

References

External links
Skeid.no Official club website

 
Football clubs in Oslo
Eliteserien clubs
1915 establishments in Norway
Association football clubs established in 1915